Bartas is a surname. Notable people with the surname include:

 Guillaume de Salluste Du Bartas (1544–1590), French courtier and poet
 Šarūnas Bartas (born 1964), Lithuanian film director
 Nojus Bartaska (born 1996), Lithuanian pop rock singer-songwriter

See also
 Barta (surname)